Please add names of notable painters with a Wikipedia page, in precise English alphabetical order, using U.S. spelling conventions. Country and regional names refer to where painters worked for long periods, not to nationalities or family background.

Herb Aach (1923–1985), American painter and writer
Hans von Aachen (1552–1615), German mannerist painter
Pacita Abad (1946–2004), Philippines multi-media artist and painter
Vilmos Aba-Novák (1894–1941), Hungarian painter and graphic artist
Riza Abbasi (1565–1635), Persian miniaturist, painter and calligrapher
Niccolò dell' Abbate (ca. 1510–1571), Italian painter
Giuseppe Abbati (1836–1868), Italian artist
Salomon van Abbé (1883–1955), English artist, etcher and illustrator
Louise Abbéma (1853–1927), French painter, sculptor and designer
Edwin Austin Abbey (1852–1911), American artist, illustrator and painter
Mary Abbott (1921–2019), American abstract expressionist painter
Basuki Abdullah (1915–1993), Southeast Asian realist painter
Rowena Meeks Abdy (1887–1945), American modernist landscape artist
Josef Abel (1768–1818), Austrian historical painter and etcher
Evelyn Abelson (1886–1967), English artist
Gertrude Abercrombie (1909–1977), American artist
John Brown Abercromby (1843–1929), Scottish painter
Johann Ludwig Aberli (1723–1786), Swiss painter and etcher
Anna Maria Barbara Abesch (1706–1773), Swiss reverse glass painter
Nikolaj Abraham Abildgaard (1743–1809), Danish artist, antiquarian and draftsman
Béla Apáti Abkarovics (1888–1957) Hungarian painter and graphic artist
Béla Nagy Abodi (1918–2012), Hungarian painter and graphic artist
Ruth Abrahams (1931–2000), English artist
Herbert Abrams (1921–2003), American portraitist
Ruth Abrams (1912–1986), American painter
Philip Absolon (born 1960), English Stuckist artist
Otto Abt (1903–1982), Swiss surrealist painter
Ismail Acar (born 1971), Turkish painter
Bernard Accama (1697–1756), Dutch historical and portrait painter
Andreas Achenbach (1815–1910), German landscape painter
Oswald Achenbach (1827–1905), German landscape painter
Patrick Adam (1852–1929), Scottish painter
Elinor Proby Adams (1885–1945), English painter and illustrator
J. Ottis Adams (1851–1927), American impressionist
John Clayton Adams (1840–1906), English landscape artist
Pat Adams (born 1928), American painter and print-maker
Robert Adamson (1821–1848), Scottish photographer and chemist
Sarah Gough Adamson (1883–1963), Scottish landscape painter
Mary Adshead (1906–1983), English painter and muralist
Jankel Adler (1895–1949), Polish/English painter and print-maker
Mór Adler (1826–1902), Hungarian painter
Willem van Aelst (1627–1683), Dutch still-life painter
Pieter Aertsen (1508–1575), Dutch historical painter
Nadir Afonso (1920–2013), Portuguese painter
Yaacov Agam (born 1928), Israeli sculptor and experimental artist
Jacques-Laurent Agasse (1767–1848), Swiss animal and landscape painter
Knud Agger (1895–1973), Danish painter
Gyula Aggházy (1850–1919), Hungarian painter and teacher 
Lubna Agha (1949–2012), South Asian artist
Christoph Ludwig Agricola (1667–1719), German landscape painter
Ai Xuan (艾軒, born 1945), Chinese painter
John Macdonald Aiken (1880–1961), Scottish painter
Ai-Mitsu (靉光, 1907–1946), Japanese surrealist
Edgar Ainsworth (1905–1975), English painter and illustrator
Ivan Aivazovsky (1817–1900), Russian painter
Tadeusz Ajdukiewicz (1852–1916), Polish portrait painter
Ras Akyem, Barbadian painter
Francesco Albani (1578–1660), Italian painter
Josef Albers (1888–1976), German/American artist, mathematician and educator
Mariotto Albertinelli (1474–1515), Italian painter
Giocondo Albertolli (1743–1839), Swiss/Italian architect, painter and sculptor
Ivan Albright (1897–1983), American artist
Kazimierz Alchimowicz (1840–1916), Lithuanian/Polish painter
Tivadar Alconiere (1797–1865) Austro-Hungarian painter
L. Alcopley (1910–1992), American artist
Eileen Aldridge (1916–1990), English painter and restorer
Pierre Alechinsky (born 1927), Belgian artist
George Aleef (1887–1970), Russian historical painter
Fyodor Alekseyev (1753–1824), Russian landscape painter
Mikoláš Aleš (1852–1913), Czech painter
Cosmo Alexander (c. 1724 – 1772), Scottish/American painter
John Alexander (died 1733), Scottish painter and engraver
Larry D. Alexander (born 1953), American realist artist, teacher and author
Lena Alexander (1899–1983), Scottish painter
Else Alfelt (1910–1974), Danish painter
Brian Alfred (born 1974), New York urban painter
Jessie Algie (1859–1927), Scottish painter
Andrew Allan (1863–1942), Scottish lithographer
David Allan (1744–1796), Scottish historical painter
Griselda Allan (1905–1987), English flower painter
Robert Weir Allan (1851–1942), Scottish/English painter
Rosemary Allan (1911–2008), English artist
Daphne Allen (1899–1985), English painter
Kathleen Allen (1906–1983), English painter and muralist
Alessandro Allori (1535–1607), Italian portrait painter
Cristofano Allori (1577–1621), Italian portrait painter
Washington Allston (1779–1843), American poet and painter
Laura Theresa Alma-Tadema (1852–1909), English painter (second wife of Lawrence Alma-Tadema)
Lawrence Alma-Tadema (1836–1912), Dutch-born English painter
Almeida Júnior (1859–1899), Brazilian realist
Charles Alston (1907–1977), American artist, muralist and teacher
Margareta Alströmer (1763–1816), Swedish painter and singer
Rudolf von Alt (1812–1908), Austrian painter
Albrecht Altdorfer (1480–1538), German painter, print-maker and architect
Altichiero (1330–1395), Italian painter
John Altoon (1925–1969), American painter and draftsman
Pedro Álvarez Castelló (1967–2004), Cuban artist
Edmond Aman-Jean (1860–1936), French symbolist painter
Tarsila do Amaral (1886–1973), Brazilian artist
Christoph Amberger (ca. 1505–1561), German painter
Friedrich von Amerling (1803–1887), Austro-Hungarian court portrait painter
Cuno Amiet (1868–1961), Swiss modernist artist
Jacopo Amigoni (1682–1752), Italian painter
Rodolfo Amoedo (1857–1941), Brazilian painter and interior designer
Rick Amor (born 1948), Australian war artist and figurative painter
An Gyeon (안견, 15th c.), Korean painter
An Zhengwen (安正文, fl. between 14th and 17th cc.), Chinese painter
Anna Ancher (1859–1935), Danish pictorial artist
Michael Ancher (1849–1927), Danish painter
Marion Ancrum (fl. 1885–1919), Scottish water-colorist
Werner Andermatt (1916–2013), Swiss painter
Sophie Gengembre Anderson (1823–1903), French-born English genre painter
Emma Andijewska (born 1931), Ukrainian surrealist painter, poet and writer
Ion Andreescu (1850–1882), Romanian impressionist
Constantine Andreou (1917–2007), Brazilian/Greek painter and sculptor
Michael Andrews (1928–1995) English painter
Anthony Angarola (1893–1929), American painter and print-maker
Marie Angel (1923–2010), English artist 
Fra Angelico (1387–1445), Early Italian Renaissance
Heinz Anger (born 1941), Austrian painter
Hermenegildo Anglada Camarasa (1872–1952), Spanish/Catalan painter
Gaston Anglade (1854–1919), French impressionist painter
Charles Angrand (1854–1926), French neo-Impressionist painter and anarchist
Sofonisba Anguissola (1532–1625), Italian painter
Peggy Angus (1904–1993), English/Scottish painter and tile and textile designer
Rita Angus (1908–1970), New Zealand painter
Albert Anker (1831–1910), Swiss painter and illustrator
Margit Anna (1913–1991), Hungarian painter
David Annand (born 1948), Scottish sculptor
Louis Anquetin (1861–1932), French painter and author
Pieter van Anraedt (1635–1678), Dutch painter
Lizzy Ansingh (1875–1959), Dutch painter
Mary Anne Ansley (fl.1810–1840), English painter
Horst Antes (born 1936), German painter and sculptor
Cornelis Anthonisz (ca. 1505–1553), Dutch painter, engraver and cartographer
Richard Anuszkiewicz (1930–2020), American artist
Shigeru Aoki (青木繁, 1882–1911), Japanese painter
Chiho Aoshima (青島千穂, born 1974), Japanese pop artist
Apelles (4th century BC), Greek painter
Zvest Apollonio (1935–2009), Italian/Slovenian painter and scenographer
Karel Appel (1921–2006), Dutch painter, sculptor and poet
Leonard Appelbee (1914–2000), English painter and print-maker
Joseph Ignaz Appiani (1706–1785), German painter
Félix Arauz (born 1935), Latin American painter from Ecuador
Janet Archer (fl.1873–1916), English painter
Giuseppe Arcimboldo (1527–1593), Italian painter
Arent Arentsz (1585–1631), Dutch landscape painter
Avigdor Arikha (1929–2010), Israeli and French painter, print-maker and art historian
Abram Arkhipov (1862–1930), Russian realist painter
István Árkossy (born 1943), Hungarian painter and graphic artist
Edward Armitage (1817–1896), English historical painter
John Armleder (born 1948), Swiss painter and sculptor
Hazel Armour (1894–1985), Scottish sculptor and medalist
John Armstrong (1893–1973), English surrealist artist
Georg Arnold-Graboné (1896–1982), German impressionist
Jean Arp (1886–1966), German/French sculptor, painter and poet
Eugenio de Arriba (1934–1977), Spanish painter
Art & Language (founded 1968), British conceptual artists, writers and painters
Richard Artschwager (1923–2013), American painter, illustrator and sculptor
Asai Chū (浅井忠, 1856–1907), Japanese yōga painter
Pieter Jansz van Asch (1603–1678), Dutch painter
Pamela Ascherson (1923–2010), English painter and sculptor
Ásgrímur Jónsson (1876–1958), Icelandic painter
Dennis Ashbaugh (born 1946), American painter
Gigadō Ashiyuki (戯画堂芦幸, early-19th century), Japanese ukiyo-e woodblock print-maker
Hans Asper (1499–1571), Swiss painter
Jan Asselijn (1610–1652), Dutch Golden Age painter
Balthasar van der Ast (1593–1657), Dutch Golden Age painter
Nikolai Astrup (1880–1928), Norwegian neo-romantic painter and print-maker
Jean-Michel Atlan (1913–1960), French artist
René Auberjonois (1872–1957), Swiss artist
Étienne Aubry (1746–1781), French painter
Louis-François Aubry (1770–1850), French portrait painter
Mary Audsley (1919–2008), English painter and sculptor
John James Audubon (1785–1851), American ornithologist, naturalist and painter
Frank Auerbach (born 1931), German/English painter
Jules Robert Auguste (1789–1850), French impressionist painter
Eric Auld (1931–2013), Scottish painter
George Ault (1891–1948), American painter
Cassandra Austen (1773–1845), English water-colorist
Giuseppe Avanzi (1645–1718), Italian Baroque painter
Edward Avedisian (1936–2007), American abstract painter
Hendrick Avercamp (1585–1634), Dutch Baroque landscape painter of the Dutch Golden Age
Milton Avery (1885–1965), American modern artist
Edward Ben Avram (born 1941), Indian/Israeli painter
Nikola Avramov (1897–1945), Bulgarian still-life painter
Awataguchi Takamitsu (粟田口隆光, fl. between 14th and 16th cc.), Japanese religious painter
Joan Ayling (1907–1993), English painter
Ay-O (靉嘔, born 1931), Japanese Fluxus artist
Aya Goda (合田彩, born 1967), Japanese author and artist
Anton Ažbe (1870–1949), Slovenian painter and teacher
Giovanni Bernardino Azzolini or Mazzolini or Asoleni (c. 1572 – c. 1645), Italian painter and sculptor

References
References can be found under each entry.

A